Katherine Edgecombe  (died 1553) was an English aristocrat and courtier.

She was born Katherine St. John, a daughter of John St. John of Bletsoe and Sybil, a daughter or cousin of Rhys ap Morgan. She was the sister of John St. John who died in 1558.

She first married Gruffydd ap Rhys ap Thomas. She was appointed to wait on Catherine of Aragon in October 1501. They served Catherine of Aragon and Prince Arthur at Ludlow Castle. Gruffydd ap Rhys died in 1521 and was buried near Prince Arthur at Worcester Cathedral. Their son, Rhys ap Gruffydd was executed for treason at the Tower of London in 1531.

Katherine married secondly Piers or Peter Edgcumbe (died August 1539) of Cotehele in Cornwall in 1532. A carved panel from a bed tester still at Cotehele, depicting the Expulsion of Adam and Eve, is sometimes said to have been hers.

The chronicle writer John Stow included a story about her at the court of Henry VIII. In June 1540, Elinor Rutland, Lady Jane Rochford, and "Lady Katherine Egecombe" were talking with Anne of Cleves at Westminster. They asked her if she was pregnant, and she said no. Katherine Edgcumbe asked if she was sure, since she slept with Henry every night. The three women made and signed a formal deposition or statement about this conversation, which was relevant to the issue of whether the royal marriage had been consummated.

In July 1543 Henry VIII wanted English servants to join the household of the infant Mary, Queen of Scots, who he hoped would marry his son Prince Edward. The diplomat Ralph Sadler recommended his friend the "Lady Edongcomb", now a widow. Sadler wrote that his own wife, Ellen Mitchell, who was pregnant, was not suitable because she was unused to life at court, and an older woman and experienced courtier like Lady Edgcumbe would be better:And, in my poor opinion, it were the more necessary, that she, whom your majesty would have to be resident about the young queen's person here, were a grave and discreet woman, of good years and experience; and the better if she were a widow, as I think the lady Edongcomb were a meet woman for such purpose, and many others, whereof I doubt not your majesty hath choice enough

Katherine Edgcumbe did not go to Scotland, as the marriage plans negotiated by Henry VIII as the Treaty of Greenwich came to nothing, and instead he launched the war now known as the Rough Wooing. In October 1543, Henry gave her a pension or annuity.

Katherine Edgcumbe made her will at Cotehele on 4 December 1553. She left household goods, some of which had belonged to Griffith ap Rhys, to her daughter Mary Luttrell at Dunster Castle. These goods were given to her by her husband Peter Edgcumbe's will. She left the rest of her goods and her Cornish tin mines to the care of her executors. Mary Luttrell was the wife of the soldier John Luttrell.

References

1553 deaths
16th-century English women
Household of Catherine of Aragon
Household of Anne of Cleves
Cotehele